Ruinerwold is a village in the Dutch province of Drenthe. It is located in the municipality of De Wolden, about 6 km northeast of Meppel.

History 
The village was first mentioned in 1792 as Ruiner wold, and means "woods belonging to Ruinen". Ruinerwold is a road village which developed on a sandy ridge in the 12th century.

It has been built in the 15th century using material of this predecessor which was built around 1150 and had been damaged by fire. The upper part of the tower was restored after a 1730 fire. Ruinerwold used to be home to rich farmers who built large farms which elaborate decorations.

Ruinerwold was home to 1,245 people in 1840. Ruinerwold was a separate municipality until 1998, when it became part of De Wolden.

Hermit family 

In October 2019, a 67-year-old man, Gerrit Jan van Dorsten, and his six adult children were discovered, who had lived for nine years in seclusion in a farm house in Ruinerwold. The father was charged with unlawful deprivation of liberty and harming other people's health. The charges were later dropped due to his poor health.

Gallery

References

External links

Local news website (in Dutch)

Municipalities of the Netherlands disestablished in 1998
Populated places in Drenthe
Former municipalities of Drenthe
De Wolden